Walddeutsche (lit. "Forest Germans" or Taubdeutsche – "Deaf Germans";  – "deaf Germans") was the name for a group of German-speaking people, originally used in the 16th century for two language islands around Łańcut and Krosno, in southeastern Poland. Both of them were fully polonised before the 18th century, the term, however, survived up to the early 20th century as the designation na Głuchoniemcach, broadly and vaguely referring to the territory of present-day Sanockie Pits, which has seen a partial German settlement since the 14th century, mostly Slavicised long before the term was coined.

Nomenclature 
The term Walddeutsche – coined by the Polish historians Marcin Bielski, 1531, Szymon Starowolski 1632, Bishop Ignacy Krasicki and Wincenty Pol – also sometimes refers to Germans living between Wisłoka and the San River part of the West Carpathian Plateau and the Central Beskidian Piedmont in Poland.

The Polish term Głuchoniemcy is a sort of pun; it means "deaf-mutes", but sounds like "forest Germans": Niemcy, Polish for "Germans", is derived from niemy ("mute", unable to talk comprehensibly, i.e. in a Slavic language), and głuchy ("deaf", i.e. "unable to communicate") sounds similar to głusz meaning "wood".

History 

In the 14th century a German settlement called Hanshof existed in the area. The Church of the Assumption of Holy Mary and St. Michael's Archangel in Haczów (Poland), the oldest wooden Gothic temple in Europe, was erected in the 14th century and was added to the UNESCO list of World Heritage Sites in 2003.

Germans settled in the territory of the Kingdom of Poland (territory of present-day Subcarpathian Voivodeship and eastern part of Lesser Poland) from the 14th to 16th centuries (see Ostsiedlung), mostly after the  region returned to Polish sphere of influence in 1340, when Casimir III of Poland took the Czerwień towns.

Marcin Bielski states that Bolesław I Chrobry settled some Germans in the region to defend the borders against Hungary and Kievan Rus' but the arrivals were ill-suited to their task and turned to farming. Maciej Stryjkowski mentions German peasants near Przeworsk, Przemyśl, Sanok, and Jarosław, describing them as good farmers. 

Some Germans were attracted by kings seeking specialists in various trades, such as craftsmen and miners. They usually settled in newer market and mining settlements. The main settlement areas were in the vicinity of Krosno and some language islands in the Pits and the Rzeszów regions. The settlers in the Pits region were known as Uplander Sachsen. Until approximately the 15th century, the ruling classes of most cities in present-day Beskidian Piedmont consisted almost exclusively of Germans.

The Beskidian Germans underwent Polonization in the latter half of the 17th and the beginning of the 18th century.

According to Wacław Maciejowski, writing in 1858, the people did not understand German but called themselves Głuchoniemcy. Wincenty Pol wrote in 1869 that their attire was similar to that of the Hungarian and Transylvanian Germans and that their main occupations were farming and weaving. He stated that in some areas the people were of Swedish origin, however, they all spoke flawlessly in a Lesser Poland dialect of Polish. In 1885, Józef Szujski wrote that the Gluchoniemcy spoke only Polish, but there were traces of a variety of original languages which showed that, when they arrived, the term Niemiec was applied to "everyone". In the modern Polish language, Niemiec refers to Germans, however, in earlier centuries, it was sometimes also used in reference to Hungarians, possibly due to similarity with the word niemy or plural niemi for "mute" or "dumb".

Settlement
Important cities of this region include Pilzno, Brzostek, Biecz, Gorlice, Ropczyce, Wielopole Skrzyńskie, Frysztak, Jasło, Krosno, Czudec, Rzeszów, Łańcut, Tyczyn, Brzozów, Jaćmierz, Rymanów, Przeworsk, Jarosław, Kańczuga, Przemyśl, Dynów, Brzozów, and Sanok.

See also
Carpathian Germans
German minority in Poland
Pogórzanie

References
Józef Szujski. Die Polen und Ruthenen in Galizien. Kraków. 1896 (Głuchoniemcy/Walddeutsche S. 17.)
Aleksander Świętochowski. Grundriß der Geschichte der polnischen Bauern, Bd. 1, Lwów-Poznań, 1925; (Głuchoniemcy/Sachsen) S. 498
 Die deutschen Vertreibungsverluste. Bevölkerungsbilanzen für die deutschen Vertreibungsgebiete 1939/50, hrsg. vom Statistischen Bundesamt, Wiesbaden 1958, pages: 275–276 bis 281 "schlesisch- deutscher Gruppe bzw. die Głuchoniemców (Walddeutsche), zwischen Dunajez und San, Entnationalisierung im 16 Jh. und 18 Jh."
Wojciech Blajer: Bemerkungen zum Stand der Forschungen uber die Enklawen der mittelalterlichen deutschen Besiedlung zwischen Wisłoka und San. [in:] Późne średniowiecze w Karpatach polskich. red. Prof. Jan Gancarski. Krosno, 2007.

Sources and notes 

German diaspora in Europe
History of Lesser Poland
History of Galicia (Eastern Europe)
People from Podkarpackie Voivodeship
History of ethnic groups in Poland
Polish people of German descent
German words and phrases
History of Red Ruthenia